Seenlandschaft Waren is an Amt in the Mecklenburgische Seenplatte district, in Mecklenburg-Vorpommern, Germany. The seat of the Amt is in Waren, itself not part of the Amt.

The Amt Seenlandschaft Waren consists of the following municipalities:

References

External links
Amt Seenlandschaft Waren website

Ämter in Mecklenburg-Western Pomerania
Mecklenburgische Seenplatte (district)